The 2006 Polish Speedway season was the 2006 season of motorcycle speedway in Poland.

Individual

Polish Individual Speedway Championship
The 2006 Individual Speedway Polish Championship final was held on 15 August at Tarnów.

Golden Helmet
The 2006 Golden Golden Helmet organised by the Polish Motor Union (PZM) was the 2006 event for the league's leading riders. The final was held on the 14 October at Rybnik.

Junior Championship
 winner - Karol Ząbik

Silver Helmet
 winner - Karol Ząbik

Bronze Helmet
 winner - Mateusz Szczepaniak

Pairs

Polish Pairs Speedway Championship
The 2006 Polish Pairs Speedway Championship consisted of three semi finals and a final.

First semi-final (Gorzów Wlkp. 16 June)

Second semi final (Częstochowa, 16 June)

Third semi final (Leszno, 16 June)

Final (1 Sep, Polonia Stadium)

Team

Team Speedway Polish Championship
The 2006 Team Speedway Polish Championship was the 2006 edition of the Team Polish Championship. WTS Wrocław won the gold medal for the second consecutive season.

Ekstraliga

1.Liga

2.Liga

Promotion/relegation play offs							
Toruń - Ostrów Wlkp. (108-82)						
Krosno - Poznań (82-96)

References

Poland Individual
Poland Team
Speedway
2006 in Polish speedway